The Lingshui River is a river in Hainan Island, China. It rises in Xianfang Mountain of northeastern Baoting Li and Miao Autonomous County and flows eastward across the Lingshui Li Autonomous County to empty into the South China Sea. The river has a length of 73.5 km and drains an area of 1,131 square km.

Notes

Rivers of Hainan